Nanjing, alternately romanized as Nanking, is the capital of Jiangsu province of the People's Republic of China. It is a sub-provincial city, a megacity, and the second largest city in Eastern China.

Situated in the Yangtze River Delta region, Nanjing has a prominent place in Chinese history and culture, having served as the capital of various Chinese dynasties, kingdoms and republican governments dating from the 3rd century to 1949, and has thus long been a major center of culture, education, research, politics, economy, transport networks and tourism, being the home to one of the world's largest inland ports. The city is also one of the fifteen sub-provincial cities in the People's Republic of China's administrative structure, enjoying jurisdictional and economic autonomy only slightly less than that of a province. Nanjing has been ranked seventh in the evaluation of "Cities with Strongest Comprehensive Strength" issued by the National Statistics Bureau, and second in the evaluation of cities with most sustainable development potential in the Yangtze River Delta. It has also been awarded the title of 2008 Habitat Scroll of Honor of China, Special UN Habitat Scroll of Honor Award and National Civilized City. Nanjing is also considered a Beta (global second-tier) city classification, together with Chongqing, Hangzhou and Tianjin by the Globalization and World Cities Research Network, and ranked as one of the world's top 100 cities in the Global Financial Centres Index.

Nanjing has many highly ranked educational institutions, with the number of universities (13) listed in 147 Double First-Class Universities ranking third (after Beijing and Shanghai), including Nanjing University, which has a long history and is among the world's top 20 universities ranked by Nature Index. The ratio of college students to the total population ranks No.1 among large cities nationwide. Nanjing has the eighth-largest scientific research output of any city in the world. As of 2022, it has been regarded as the world's top second scientific research center in earth & environmental sciences after Beijing and the world's top third scientific research center in chemistry (behind Beijing and Shanghai), according to the Nature Index.

Nanjing, one of the nation's most important cities for over a thousand years, is recognized as one of the Four Great Ancient Capitals of China. It has been one of the world's largest cities, enjoying peace and prosperity despite wars and disasters. Nanjing served as the capital of Eastern Wu (229–280), one of the three major states in the Three Kingdoms period; the Eastern Jin and each of the Southern dynasties (Liu Song, Southern Qi, Liang and Chen), which successively ruled southern China from 317 to 589; the Southern Tang (937–75), one of the Ten Kingdoms; the Ming dynasty when, for the first time, all of China was ruled from the city (1368–1421); and the Republic of China under the nationalist Kuomintang (1927–37, 1946–49) before its flight to Taiwan by Chiang Kai-Shek during the Chinese Civil War. The city also served as the seat of the rebel Taiping Heavenly Kingdom (1853–64) and the Japanese puppet regime of Wang Jingwei (1940–45) during the Second Sino-Japanese War. It suffered severe atrocities in both conflicts, most notably the Nanjing massacre of 1937.

Nanjing has served as the capital city of Jiangsu province since the establishment of the People's Republic of China. It has many important heritage sites, including the Presidential Palace and Sun Yat-sen Mausoleum. Nanjing is famous for human historical landscapes, mountains and waters such as Fuzimiao, Ming Palace, Chaotian Palace, Porcelain Tower, Drum Tower, Stone City, City Wall, Qinhuai River, Xuanwu Lake and Purple Mountain. Key cultural facilities include Nanjing Library, Nanjing Museum and Jiangsu Art Museum.

Names
The city has a number of other names, and some historical names are now used as names of districts of the city; among them there is the name Jiangning, whose first character Jiang (i.e. the Yangtze) is the former part of the name Jiangsu and second character Ning (simplified form ) is the shortened name of Nanjing. When it was the capital of China, for instance under the ROC, Jing was adopted as the abbreviation of Nanjing.

Jianye which means "Build an Empire", was officially designated for the city during the Eastern Wu dynasty.

The city first became a Chinese national capital as early as the Jin dynasty. The name Nanjing, which means "Southern Capital", was officially designated for the city during the Ming dynasty, about six hundred years later. Nanjing is sometimes known as Jinling or Ginling ("Gold Hill") of the eponymous Ginling College; the old name has been used since the Warring States period in the Zhou dynasty. In English, the spelling Nanking was traditional until Pinyin, developed in the 1950s and internationally adopted in the 1980s, standardized the spelling as "Nanjing".

History

Early history

Archaeological discovery shows that "Nanjing Man" lived more than 500 thousand years ago. Zun, a kind of wine vessel, was found to exist in Beiyinyangying culture of Nanjing in about 5000 years ago. There were ancient human activities in the Nanjing area 6000 years ago. About 7000 years ago, there was an agricultural civilitation in Qixia area today. In the downtown area of Gulou Gangbei Yinyangying and Taowu Township, Jiangning District, the ruins of primitive villages from the Neolithic Age were discovered more than 6000 years ago. About 4000 years ago, dense Bronze Age primitive settlements appeared in the Qinhuai River Basin, known as the Hushu Culture. Based on these settlements, the earliest cities in Nanjing were formed. Hushu culture developed into Wu culture under the influence of Shang and Zhou cultures in the Central Plains. In 571 BC, the State of Chu established Tangyi in Liuhe, and the Tangyi doctor was set up. This is the earliest administrative establishment in Nanjing in history, and it has a history of 2591 by 2020. In 541 BC, Wu State built Laizhu Town in Gaochun. Because of its strong city, it was also called Gucheng. In 473 years ago, Wu was destroyed by Yue, and the city was built at the mouth of the Qinhuai River in the following year. Later it was called Yuecheng, which was the beginning of the construction of the main city of Nanjing. In 333 BC, Chu defeated Yue and built Jinling Town on the Stone Mountain by the river. It was the earliest administrative construction in the main city of Nanjing. The name of Jinling comes from this. In 210 BC, the first emperor of Qin visited the east and changed Jinling City to Moling County,

In the late period of Shang dynasty, Taibo of Zhou came to Jiangnan and established Wu state, and the first stop is in Nanjing area according to some historians based on discoveries in Taowu and Hushu culture. According to a legend quoted by an artist in Ming dynasty, Chen Yi, Fuchai, King of the State of Wu, founded a fort named Yecheng in today's Nanjing area in 495BC. Later in 473BC, the State of Yue conquered Wu and constructed the fort of Yuecheng on the outskirts of the present-day Zhonghua Gate. In 333BC, after eliminating the State of Yue, the State of Chu built Jinling Yi in the western part of present-day Nanjing. It was renamed Moling during the reign of the First Emperor of Qin. Since then, the city experienced destruction and renewal many times. The area was successively part of Kuaiji, Zhang and Danyang prefectures in Qin and Han dynasty, and part of Yangzhou region which was established as the nation's 13 supervisory and administrative regions in the 5th year of Yuanfeng in Han dynasty (106BC). Nanjing was later the capital city of Danyang Prefecture, and had been the capital city of Yangzhou for about 400 years from late Han to early Tang.

Capital of the Six Dynasties  

Nanjing first became a state capital in AD229, when the state of Eastern Wu founded by Sun Quan during the Three Kingdoms period relocated its capital to Jianye, the city extended on the basis of Jinling Yi in AD211. Although conquered by the Western Jin dynasty in 280, Nanjing and its neighboring areas had been well cultivated, developing into one of the commercial, cultural and political centers of China during the Eastern Wu. This city would soon play a vital role in the following centuries. At the end of the Eastern Han Dynasty, Sun Quan, who ruled Jiangdong, moved his ruling office to Moling in 211. The following year, he built a stone city fortress in the old place of Jinling Town. In 229, Sun Quan proclaimed himself emperor in Wuchang and established Dong Wu (Eastern Wu). Then he moved his capital to Jianye, known as the "Zhongshan Dragon Plate, Stone Tigers", and opened the history of Nanjing as the capital. In 280, the Western Jin Dynasty destroyed Wu and rebuilt the industry into Moling. In 282, with the Qinhuai River as the boundary, Moling was divided into two counties, Jianye and Moling. In 313, Ye was renamed Jiankang because of avoiding the name taboo of Emperor Sima Ye of the Jin Dynasty. In 317, Emperor Sima Rui of the Jin and Yuan dynasties was building a country, known as the Eastern Jin Dynasty, and the northern gentry moved south. After more than 270 years of the Great Separatism between North and South, Jiankang became the orthodox place of China.

Shortly after the unification of the region, the Western Jin dynasty collapsed. First the rebellions by eight Jin princes for the throne and later rebellions and invasion from Xiongnu and other nomadic peoples that destroyed the rule of the Jin dynasty in the north. In 317, remnants of the Jin court, as well as nobles and wealthy families, fled from the north to the south and reestablished the Jin court in Nanjing, which was then called Jiankang, replacing Luoyang. This marked the first time a Chinese dynastic capital moved to southern China.

During the period of North–South division, Nanjing remained the capital of the Southern dynasties for more than two and a half centuries. During this time, Nanjing was the international hub of East Asia. Based on historical documents, the city had 280,000 registered households. Assuming an average Nanjing household consisted of about 5.1 people, the city had more than 1.4 million residents.

A number of sculptural ensembles of that era, erected at the tombs of royals and other dignitaries, have survived (in various degrees of preservation) in Nanjing's northeastern and eastern suburbs, primarily in Qixia and Jiangning District. Possibly the best preserved of them is the ensemble of the Tomb of Xiao Xiu (475–518), a brother of Emperor Wu of Liang.

Six Dynasties is a collective term for six Chinese dynasties mentioned above which all maintained national capitals at Jiankang. The six dynasties were: Eastern Wu (222–280), Eastern Jin dynasty (317–420) and four southern dynasties (420–589).

Destruction and revival 

The period of division ended when the Sui dynasty reunified China and almost destroyed the entire city, turning it into a small town. The city was razed after the Sui took it over. It was renamed  in the Tang dynasty and resuscitated during the late Tang.

It was chosen as the capital and called  during the Southern Tang (937–976), which succeeded the state of Yang Wu. It was renamed  "Pacified Area of the Yangtze") in the Northern Song and renamed Jiankang in the Southern Song. Jiankang's textile industry burgeoned and thrived during the Song despite the constant threat of foreign invasions from the north by the Jurchen-led Jin dynasty. The court of Da Chu, a short-lived puppet state established by the Jurchens, and the court of Song were once in the city.

The Southern Song were eventually destroyed by the Mongols; during their rule as the Yuan dynasty, the city's status as a hub of the textile industry was further consolidated. According to Odoric of Pordenone, Chilenfu (Nanjing) had 360 stone bridges, which were finer than anywhere else in the world. It was well populated and had a large craft industry.

Southern capital of the Ming dynasty 

After Zhu Yuanzhang (known from his era as the Hongwu Emperor) overthrew the Yuan and established the Ming dynasty, he renamed the city  rebuilt it, and made it the dynastic capital in 1368, overseeing the surrounding areas under a special administration. It took 200,000 laborers 21 years to finish the wall, which was intended to defend the city and its surrounding region from coastal pirates. The present-day City Wall of Nanjing was mainly built during that time and today it remains in good condition and has been well preserved. It is among the longest surviving city walls in China. The Jianwen Emperor ruled from Yingtian from 1398 to 1402. It is believed that Nanjing was the largest city in the world from 1358 to 1425 with a population of 487,000 in 1400. 

Having usurped power from his nephew and uncertain of the loyalty of the region's officials, the Yongle Emperor relocated the capital in 1421 to Beijing, where he had long served as the regional governor as the Prince of Yan. Because the new status of Yingtian was included in the Hongwu Emperor's "ancestral injunctions" for his dynasty, however, the Yongle Emperor was obliged to preserve its special status, at least in name.  The "northern capital" came to be known as Beijing and the "southern capital" as  Both controlled territories "directly administered" by the emperor and his staff, Beizhili in the north and Nanzhili in the south.

The Hongxi Emperor wanted to restore Nanjing as the sole imperial capital and undertook preparations to do so. On 24 February 1425, he appointed Admiral Zheng He as the defender of Nanjing and ordered him to continue his command over the Ming treasure fleet for the city's defense. Zheng He governed the city with three eunuchs for internal matters and two military noblemen for external matters, awaiting the Hongxi Emperor's return along with the military establishment from the north. The emperor died on 29 May 1425 before this could have taken place. 

The succeeding Xuande Emperor preferred to remain in Beijing, leaving it the primary and de facto capital and Nanjing as permanent secondary or reserve capital. Owing to the continuing importance of the ancestral injunctions, however, Nanjing was designated in official documents as the actual capital and Beijing as a temporary capital from 1425 to 1441. In 1441, the Yingzong Emperor ordered the "provisional" prefix removed from Beijing's government seals and further ordered that the southern imperial administration would henceforth be required to prefix "Nanjing" to their own seals to distinguish them.

Besides the city wall, other Ming-era structures in the city included the famous Ming Xiaoling Mausoleum and Porcelain Tower, although the latter was destroyed by the Taipings in the 19th century either to prevent a hostile faction from using it to observe and shell the city or from superstitious fear of its geomantic properties.

As the center of the empire, early-Ming Nanjing had worldwide connections. It was home of the admiral Zheng He, who went to sail the Pacific and Indian Oceans, and it was visited by foreign dignitaries, such as a king from Borneo, who died during his visit to China in 1408. The Tomb of the King of Boni, with a spirit way and a tortoise stele, was discovered in Yuhuatai District (south of the walled city) in 1958, and has been restored.

Capital of the Southern Ming
Over two centuries after the removal of the capital to Beijing, Nanjing was destined to become the capital of a Ming emperor one more time. After the fall of Beijing to Li Zicheng's rebel forces and then to the Manchu-led Qing dynasty in the spring of 1644, the Ming prince Zhu Yousong was enthroned in Nanjing in June 1644 as the Hongguang Emperor. His short reign was described by later historians as the first reign of the so-called Southern Ming dynasty.

Zhu Yousong, however, fared a lot worse than his ancestor Zhu Yuanzhang three centuries earlier. Beset by factional conflicts, his regime could not offer effective resistance to Qing forces, when the Qing army, led by the Manchu prince Dodo approached Jiangnan the next spring. Days after Yangzhou fell to the Manchus in late May 1645, the Hongguang Emperor fled Nanjing, and the imperial Ming Palace was looted by local residents. On June 6, Dodo's troops approached Nanjing, and the commander of the city's garrison, Zhao the Earl of Xincheng, promptly surrendered the city to them. The Manchus soon ordered all male residents of the city to shave their heads in the Manchu queue way. They requisitioned a large section of the city for the bannermen's cantonment, and occupied the former imperial Ming Palace, but otherwise the city was spared the mass murders and destruction that befell Yangzhou.

Despite capturing many counties in his initial attack due to surprise and having the initiative, Koxinga announced the final battle in Nanjing in 1659 ahead of time giving plenty of time for the Qing to prepare because he wanted a decisive, single grand showdown as his father successfully did against the Dutch at the Battle of Liaoluo Bay, throwing away the surprise and initiative which led to its failure. Koxinga's attack on Qing held Nanjing which would interrupt the supply route of the Grand Canal leading to possible starvation in Beijing caused such fear that the Manchus (Tartares) considered returning to Manchuria (Tartary) and abandoning China according to a 1671 account by a French missionary. The commoners and officials in Beijing and Nanjing were waiting to support whichever side won. An official from Qing Beijing sent letters to family and another official in Nanjing, telling them all communication and news from Nanjing to Beijing had been cut off, that the Qing were considering abandoning Beijing and moving their capital far away to a remote location for safety since Koxinga's iron troops were rumored to be invincible. The letter said it reflected the grim situation being felt in Qing Beijing. The official told his children in Nanjing to prepare to defect to Koxinga which he himself was preparing to do. Koxinga's forces intercepted these letters and after reading them Koxinga may have started to regret his deliberate delays allowing the Qing to prepare for a final massive battle instead of swiftly attacking Nanjing. Koxinga's Ming loyalists fought against a majority Han Chinese Bannermen Qing army when attacking Nanjing.  The siege lasted almost three weeks, beginning on August 24.  Koxinga's forces were unable to maintain a complete encirclement, which enabled the city to obtain supplies and even reinforcements—though cavalry attacks by the city's forces were successful even before reinforcements arrived.  Koxinga's forces were defeated and "slipped back" (Wakeman's phrase) to the ships which had brought them.

Qing dynasty and Taiping Rebellion 

Under the Qing dynasty from 1645 to 1911, Nanjing returned to its previous name Jiangning, romanized at the time as Kiangning or simply referenced as Nanking. At first, it continued to administer the territory of Nanzhili under the name Jiangnan ("Area South of the Yangtze") but this administration was soon broken up into "Right" and "Left" governments based in Suzhou and Jiangning respectively. After a series of reorganizations, at some point under the Qianlong Emperor, Jiangnan was fully divided into the present provinces of Anhui and Jiangsu. Separately, however, these provinces were reunited under the supervision of a new Viceroy of Liangjiang after 1723, whose seat was based in Jiangning. It was the site of a Qing Army garrison. It had been visited by the Kangxi and Qianlong emperors a number of times on their tours of the southern provinces. The 1842 Treaty of Nanking, which put an end to the First Opium War, was signed in the city harbor on Royal Navy warships. 

As the capital of the brief-lived rebel Taiping Heavenly Kingdom in the mid-19th century, Nanjing was known as Tianjing. The rebellion destroyed most of the former Ming imperial buildings in the city, including the Porcelain Tower, considered up to that time as one of the wonders of the world. Both the Qing viceroy and the Taiping king resided in buildings that would later be known as the Presidential Palace. When Qing forces led by Zeng Guofan retook the city in 1864, a massive slaughter occurred in the city with over 100,000 estimated to have committed suicide or fought to the death. Since the Taiping Rebellion began, Qing forces allowed no rebels speaking its dialect to surrender. This systematic mass murder of civilians occurred in Nanjing.

The New York Methodist Mission Society's superintendent Virgil Hart arrived in Nanjing in 1881. After some time, he succeeded in buying land near the city's Southern Gate and Confucian Temple to build the city's first Methodist church, Western hospital (Blackstone Methodist Hospital) and boys' school. The hospital would later be unified with the Drum Tower Hospital and the boys' school would be expanded by later missionaries to become the University of Nanking and Medical School. The old mission property became the No. 13 Middle School, the oldest continually-used school grounds in the city.

Capital of the Republic and Nanjing Massacre 

The Xinhai Revolution led to the founding of the Republic of China in January 1912 with Sun Yat-sen as the first provisional president and Nanjing was selected as its new capital. However, the Qing Empire controlled large regions to the north, so the revolutionaries asked Yuan Shikai to replace Sun as president in exchange for the abdication of Puyi, the last emperor. Yuan demanded the capital be moved to Beijing (closer to his power base).

In 1927, the Kuomintang (KMT; Nationalist Party) under Generalissimo Chiang Kai-shek again established Nanjing as the capital of the Republic of China, and this became internationally recognized once KMT forces took Beijing in 1928. The following decade is known as the Nanking decade. During this decade, Nanjing was of symbolic and strategic importance. The Ming dynasty had made Nanjing a capital, the republic had been established there in 1912, and Sun Yat-sen's provisional government had been there. Sun's body was brought and placed in a grand mausoleum to cement Chiang's legitimacy. Chiang was born in the neighboring province of Zhejiang and the general area had strong popular support for him.

In 1927, the Nationalist government proposed a comprehensive planning proposal, the Capital Plan, to reconstruct the war-torn city of Nanjing into a modern capital. It was a decade of extraordinary growth with an enormous amount of construction. A lot of government buildings, residential houses, and modern public infrastructures were built. During this boom, Nanjing reputedly became one of the most modern cities in China.

In 1937, the Empire of Japan started a full-scale invasion of China after invading Manchuria in 1931, beginning the Second Sino-Japanese War (often considered a theater of World War II). Their troops occupied Nanjing in December and carried out the systematic and brutal Nanking massacre (the "Rape of Nanking"). Even children, the elderly, and nuns are reported to have suffered at the hands of the Imperial Japanese Army. The total death toll, including estimates made by the International Military Tribunal for the Far East and the Nanjing War Crimes Tribunal after the atomic bombings, was between 300,000 and 350,000. The city itself was also severely damaged during the massacre. The Nanjing Massacre Memorial Hall was built in 1985 to commemorate this event.

A few days before the fall of the city, the National Government of China was relocated to the southwestern city Chungking (Chongqing) and resumed Chinese resistance. In 1940, a Japanese-collaborationist government known as the "Nanjing Regime" or "Reorganized National Government of China" led by Wang Jingwei was established in Nanjing as a rival to Chiang Kai-shek's government in Chongqing. In 1946, after the Surrender of Japan, the KMT relocated its central government back to Nanjing.

Chinese Civil War and People's Republic 
 
On 21 April 1949, Communist forces crossed the Yangtze River. On April 23, the Communist People's Liberation Army (PLA) captured Nanjing. The KMT government retreated to Canton (Guangzhou) until October 15, Chongqing until November 25, and then Chengdu before retreating to the island of Taiwan on December 10 where Taipei was proclaimed the temporary capital of the Republic of China. By late 1949, the PLA was pursuing remnants of KMT forces southwards in southern China, and only Tibet and Hainan Island were left.

After the establishment of the People's Republic of China in October 1949, Nanjing was initially a province-level municipality, but it was soon merged into Jiangsu and again became the provincial capital by replacing Zhenjiang which was transferred in 1928, and retains that status to this day.

Geography 

The Yangtze River flows past the west side and then the north side of Nanjing City, while the Ningzheng Ridge surrounds the north, east and south sides of the city. The Yangtze River flows downstream from Jiujiang, Jiangxi, through Anhui and Jiangsu to the East China Sea. The northern part of the lower Yangtze drainage basin is the Huai River basin and the southern part is the Zhe River basin; they are connected by the Grand Canal east of Nanjing. The area around Nanjing is called Xiajiang (Downstream River) region, with Jianghuai dominant in the northern part and Jiangzhe dominant in the southern part. The region is also well known as Dongnan (South East, the Southeast) and Jiangnan (and River South, South of Yangtze).

Nanjing borders Yangzhou to the northeast (one town downstream when following the north bank of the Yangtze); Zhenjiang to the east (one town downstream when following the south bank of the Yangtze); and Changzhou to the southeast. On its western boundary is Anhui, where Nanjing borders five prefecture-level cities: Chuzhou to the northwest, Wuhu, Chaohu and Ma'anshan to the west and Xuancheng to the southwest.

Nanjing is at the intersection of the Yangtze River, an east–west water transport artery, and the Nanjing–Beijing railway, a north–south land transport artery, hence the name “door of the east and west, throat of the south and north”. Furthermore, the west part of the Ningzhen range is in Nanjing; the Loong-like Zhong Mountain curls round the east side of the city, while the tiger-like Stone Mountain crouches in the west of the city, hence the name “the Zhong Mountain, a dragon curling, and the Stone Mountain, a tiger crouching”.

Climate and environment 

Nanjing has a humid subtropical climate (Köppen Cfa) and is influenced by the East Asian monsoon. The four seasons are distinct, with damp conditions seen throughout the year, very hot and muggy summers, cold, damp winters, and in between, spring and autumn are of reasonable length. Along with Chongqing and Wuhan, Nanjing is traditionally referred to as one of the "Three Furnaces" along the Yangtze River for the perennially high temperatures in the summertime. However, the time from mid-June to the end of July is the plum blossom blooming season in which the meiyu (rainy season of East Asia; literally "plum rain") occurs, during which the city experiences a period of mild rain as well as dampness. Since the meteorological record was made in 1905, the temperature has experienced a change of first rising, then falling and rising. The northeast wind prevails in winter. The number of precipitation days greater than 0.1 mm was 113.7 days, and the extreme maximum annual precipitation days were 160 days in 1957.

Typhoons are uncommon but possible in the late stages of summer and early part of autumn. With monthly percent possible sunshine ranging from 37 percent in March to 52 percent in August, the city receives 1,926 hours of bright sunshine annually. 
Nanjing is endowed with rich natural resources, which include more than 40 kinds of minerals. Among them, iron and sulfur reserves make up 40 percent of those of Jiangsu province. Its reserves of strontium rank first in East Asia and the South East Asia region. Nanjing also possesses abundant water resources, both from the Yangtze River and groundwater. In addition, it has several natural hot springs such as Tangshan Hot Spring in Jiangning and Tangquan Hot Spring in Pukou.

Sun Yat-sen once summarized and lauded the feature of Nanjing in his book The International Development of China:Nanking was the old capital of China before Peking, and is situated in a fine locality which comprises high mountains, deep water and a vast level plain—a rare site to be found in any part of the world. It also lies at the center of a very rich country on both sides of the lower Yangtze.To be more exact, surrounded by the Yangtze River and mountains, the urban area of the city enjoys its scenic natural environment. Xuanwu Lake and Mochou Lake are located in the center of the city and are easily accessible to the public, while Purple Mountain is covered with deciduous and coniferous forests preserving various historical and cultural sites. Meanwhile, a Yangtze River deep-water channel is under construction to enable Nanjing to handle the navigation of 50,000 DWT vessels from the East China Sea.

Cityscape

Environmental issues

Air pollution in 2013
A lack of cold air flow, combined with slow-moving air masses carrying industrial emissions, collected airborne pollutants to form a thick layer of smog over the region. The heavy smog heavily polluted central and southern Jiangsu Province, especially in and around Nanjing, with its AQI pollution Index at "severely polluted" for five straight days and "heavily polluted" for nine. On 3 December 2013, levels of PM2.5 particulate matter average over 943 micrograms per cubic meter, falling to over 338 micrograms per cubic meter on 4 December 2013. Between 3:00 pm, 3 December and 2:00 pm, 4 December local time, several expressways from Nanjing to other Jiangsu cities were closed, stranding dozens of passenger buses in Zhongyangmen bus station. From 5 to 6 December, Nanjing issued a red alert for air pollution and closed down all kindergarten through middle schools. Children's Hospital outpatient services increased by 33 percent; general incidence of bronchitis, pneumonia, upper respiratory tract infections significantly increased. The smog dissipated 12 December. Officials blamed the dense pollution on lack of wind, automobile exhaust emissions under low air pressure, and coal-powered district heating system in north China. Prevailing winds blew low-hanging air masses of factory emissions (mostly SO2) towards China's east coast.

Government

At present, the full name of the government of Nanjing is "People's Government of Nanjing City" and the city is under the one-party rule of the CPC, with the CPC Nanjing Committee Secretary as the de facto governor of the city and the mayor as the executive head of the government working under the secretary.

Administrative divisions
The sub-provincial city of Nanjing is divided into 11 districts.

Demographics

At the time of the 2010 census, the total population of the City of Nanjing was 8.005 million. The OECD estimated the encompassing metropolitan area at the time as 11.7 million. Official statistics in 2011 estimated the city's population to be 8.11 million. The birth rate was 8.86 percent and the death rate was 6.88 percent. The urban area had a population of 6.47 million people. The sex ratio of the city population was 107.31 males to 100 females.

As in most of eastern China, the official ethnic makeup of Nanjing is predominantly Han nationality (98.56 percent), with 50 other official ethnic groups. In 1999, 77,394 residents belonged to officially defined minorities, among which the vast majority (64,832) were Hui, contributing 83.76 percent to the minority population. The second and third largest minority groups were Manchu (2,311) and Zhuang (533). Most of the minority nationalities resided in Jianye District, comprising 9.13 percent of the district's population.

Economy

Earlier development

There was a massive cultivating in the area of Nanjing from the Three Kingdoms period to Southern dynasties. The sparse population led to land as royal rewards were granted for rules’ people. At first, the landless peasants benefited from it, then the senior officials and aristocratic families. Since large numbers of immigrants flooded into the area, reclamation was quite common in its remote parts, which promoted its agricultural development.

The craft industries, by contrast, had a faster growth. Especially the textiles section, there were about 200,000 craftsmen by the late Qing. Several dynasties established their imperial textiles bureaus in Nanjing. The Nanjing Brocade is their exquisite product as the cloth for the royal garments such as dragon robes. Meanwhile, the satins from Nanjing were called "tribute satins" (""), because they were usually paid as tribute to the monarchy. Besides, minting, papermaking, shipbuilding grew initially since the Three Kingdoms period. As Nanjing was the capital of the Ming dynasty, the industries further expanded, where both state-owned and numerous private businesses served the imperial court. Several place names in Nanjing remains witnessed them, such as Wangjinshi (the market sells wangjin), Guyilang (the corridor for garments bargain), Youfangqiao (the bridge near an oil mill).

Moreover, the trade in Nanjing was also flourishing. The Ming dynasty drawing Prosperous Nanjing depicts a vivid market scene bustling with people and full of various sorts of shops. However, the economic developments were almost wiped out by the Taiping Rebellion's catastrophe.

Modern times

Into the first half of the twentieth century after the establishment of ROC, Nanjing gradually shifted from being a production hub towards being a heavy consumption city, mainly because of the rapid expansion of its wealthy population after Nanjing once again regained the political spotlight of China. A number of huge department stores such as Zhongyang Shangchang sprouted up, attracting merchants from all over China to sell their products in Nanjing. In 1933, the revenue generated by the food and entertainment industry in the city exceeded the sum of the output of the manufacturing and agriculture industry. One third of the city population worked in the service industry, .

In the 1950s after PRC was established by CPC, the government invested heavily in the city to build a series of state-owned heavy industries, as part of the national plan of rapid industrialization, converting it into a heavy industry production center of east China. Overenthusiastic in building a “world-class” industrial city, the government also made many disastrous mistakes during development, such as spending hundreds of millions of yuan to mine for non-existent coal, resulting in negative economic growth in the late 1960s. From the 1960s to 1980s there were five pillar industries, namely, electronics, automobiles, petrochemical, iron and steel, and power, each with big state-owned firms. After the Reform and Opening recovering market economy, the state-owned enterprises found themselves incapable of competing with efficient multinational firms and local private firms, hence were either mired in heavy debt or forced into bankruptcy or privatization and this resulted in large numbers of laid-off workers who were technically not unemployed but effectively jobless.

Today

The current economy of the city is basically newly developed based on the past. Service industries are dominating, accounting for about 60 percent of the GDP of the city, and financial industry, culture industry and tourism industry are top 3 of them. Industries of information technology, energy saving and environmental protection, new energy, smart power grid and intelligent equipment manufacturing have become pillar industries. Big civilian-run enterprise include Suning Commerce, Yurun, Sanpower, Fuzhong, Hiteker, 5stars, Jinpu, Tiandi, CTTQ Pharmaceutical, Nanjing Iron and Steel Company and Simcere Pharmaceutical. Big state-owned firms include Panda Electronics, Yangzi Petrochemical, Jinling Petrochemical, Nanjing Chemical, Jincheng Motors, Jinling Pharmaceutical, Chenguang and NARI. The city has also attracted foreign investment, multinational firms such as Siemens, Ericsson, Volkswagen, Iveco, A.O. Smith, and Sharp have established their lines, and a number of multinationals such as Ford, IBM, Lucent, Samsung and SAP established research center there. Many China-based leading firms such as Huawei, ZTE and Lenovo have key R&D institutes in the city. Nanjing is an industrial technology research and development hub, hosting many R&D centers and institutions, especially in areas of electronics technology, information technology, computer software, biotechnology and pharmaceutical technology and new material technology.

In recent years, Nanjing has been developing its economy, commerce, industry, as well as city construction. In 2013 the city's GDP was RMB 801 billion (3rd in Jiangsu), and GDP per capita (current price) was RMB 98,174(US$16041), an 11 percent increase from 2012. The average urban resident's disposable income was RMB 36,200, while the average rural resident's net income was RMB 14,513. The registered urban unemployment rate was 3.02 percent, lower than the national average (4.3 percent). Nanjing's Gross Domestic Product ranked 12th in 2013 in China, and its overall competence ranked 6th in mainland and 8th including Taiwan and Hong Kong in 2009.
Industrial zones
There are a number of industrial zones in Nanjing.

Nanjing New and High-Tech Industry Development Zone

Nanjing Baixia Hi-Tech Industrial Zone 

Nanjing Economic and Technological Development Zone

Transport
Nanjing is the transport hub in eastern China and the downstream Yangtze River area. Different means of transport constitute a three-dimensional transport system that includes land, water and air. As in most other Chinese cities, public transport is the dominant mode of travel for the majority of citizens. As from October 2014, Nanjing had four bridges and two tunnels over the Yangtze River, linking districts north of the river with the city center on the south bank.

Rail

Nanjing is an important railway hub in eastern China. It serves as rail junction for the Beijing-Shanghai (Jinghu) (which is itself composed of the old Jinpu and Huning Railways), Nanjing–Tongling Railway (Ningtong), Nanjing–Qidong (Ningqi), and the Nanjing-Xi'an (Ningxi) which encompasses the Hefei–Nanjing Railway.
Nanjing is connected to the national high-speed railway network by Beijing–Shanghai High-Speed Railway and Shanghai–Wuhan–Chengdu Passenger Dedicated Line, with several more high-speed rail lines under construction. The main stations in Nanjing are Nanjing Station, Nanjing South Station, Jiangning Station, Lishui Station, Xianlin Station, Jiangning West Station, Nanjing East Station, Nanjing Passenger and Technical Station, as well as the new Nanjing North Station and Lukou Air-Rail Intermodal Transport Hub Station planning in. Among them, Nanjing Railway Station is the national railway hub station and China's top ten railway hubs, Nanjing South Railway Station is the national railway hub station and Asia's largest high-speed railway station, and Nanjing East Railway Station is the largest marshalling station in East China and the country's 15th largest railway network marshalling station. Nanjing Passenger Technology Station is a train technology station

Among all 17 railway stations in Nanjing, passenger rail service is mainly provided by Nanjing Railway Station and Nanjing South Railway Station, while other stations like Nanjing West Railway Station, Zhonghuamen Railway Station and Xianlin Railway Station serve minor roles. Nanjing Railway Station was first built in 1968. On November 12, 1999, the station was burnt in a serious fire. Reconstruction of the station was finished on September 1, 2005. Nanjing South Railway Station, which is one of the 5 hub stations on Beijing–Shanghai High-Speed Railway, has officially been claimed as the largest railway station in Asia and the second largest in the world in terms of GFA (Gross Floor Area). Construction of Nanjing South Station began on 10 January 2008. The station was opened for public service in 2011.

Aviation 
Nanjing is one of the earliest cities in China to establish civil aviation, and has built 13 airports. The first airport was the Xiaoying Airport built by the Nationalist Government in 1912. In 1927, the Ming Palace Airport was built on the Ming Palace site as a military-civilian airport. The Daxiaochang Airport was completed in 1929. As a training site for the Chinese Air Force, it established the country's largest shooting range at the time. It was one of the largest aviation bases in China's history. It was also the airport with the best facilities at the time. It was designated as the highest level of aviation in China before the Anti-Japanese War Terminus. The Central Aviation School, founded in April 1931 in the University Field, is known as the cradle of the Chinese Air Force. In 1934, Dajiaochang Airport was officially opened as a military airport, and Ming Palace Airport was a civilian airport. In July 1956, Nanjing Civil Aviation moved to Dajiaochang Airport, and Dajiaochang was used by both military and civilian use. In July 1997, Nanjing Lukou International Airport was opened, civil aviation moved to Lukou Airport, and Dajiaochang Airport was retained as a military airport. Nanjing Ma'an International Airport was opened in July 2015, and the entire Daxiaochang Airport was relocated here. and Dajiaochang Airport was retained as a military airport. Nanjing Ma'an International Airport was opened in July 2015, and the entire Daxiaochang Airport was relocated here. and Dajiaochang Airport was retained as a military airport. Nanjing Ma'an International Airport was opened in July 2015, and the entire Daxiaochang Airport was relocated here.

Nanjing Lukou International Airport is the gateway airport of Jiangsu Province and Nanjing City. It is a major national trunk airport, a first-class aviation port, and a major cargo airport in East China. It is an alternate airport with Shanghai Hongqiao Airport and Pudong Airport. 10,000-class large-scale airport ranks as a large national hub airport, China's air cargo center, express mail distribution center, and a national regional transportation hub. It has established a route network radiating Asia, connecting Europe and America, and reaching Australia.

In addition, Nanjing also has Nanjing Ma'an International Airport (for military and civilian use), Tushan Airport (for military use), and Ruohang Nanjing Laoshan Airport (China's first private heliport).

Shipping 
Nanjing is an important shipping center in China. Dong Wu (Eastern Wu) of the Three Kingdoms owns military ports and commercial ports and sails overseas. During the Eastern Jin and Southern Dynasties, it was "a river that stretched across the five continents". In the Yuan Dynasty, Nanjing was one of the shipping ports for the transportation of grain from the south to the north. In the Ming Dynasty, Nanjing Port became the base port and departure port for Zheng He's voyages.

Contemporary Nanjing Port is an important hub port in China and a first-class port open to the outside world. It is a multifunctional river-sea port in East China and the Yangtze River Basin for reloading, land and water transfer, cargo distribution and opening to the outside world. It is the only container railway and waterway in the Yangtze River Delta. A seamless port. The completion of the 12.5-meter deep-water channel project below the Yangtze River in Nanjing has made Nanjing Port the deepest inland international deep-water seaport, and it is also a comprehensive hub for China's global river-to-sea transshipment.

Road

As an important regional hub in the Yangtze River Delta, Nanjing is well-connected by over 60 state and provincial highways to all parts of China.

Motorways such as Hu–Ning, Ning–He, Ning–Hang enable commuters to travel to Shanghai, Hefei, Hangzhou, and other important cities quickly and conveniently. The total road coverage density of the city is 112.56 kilometers per hundred square kilometers (181.15 mi/100 sq mi). The two artery roads in Nanjing are Zhongshan Road and Hanzhong Road are also the two main roads which cross each other in the city center, Xinjiekou.

Expressways {G+XXxx (National Express), S+XX}:
G25 Changchun–Shenzhen Expressway
G36 Nanjing–Luoyang Expressway
G40 Shanghai–Xi'an Expressway
G42 Shanghai–Chengdu Expressway
G4211 Nanjing–Wuhu Expressway, a spur of G42 that extends west to Wuhu, Anhui
S55 Nanjing–Gaochun（Xuancheng） Expressway
S38 Yanjiang Expressway
G2503 Nanjing Ring Expressway
S001 Nanjing Ring Highway

National Highway

Nanjing is a national comprehensive transportation hub, and its highway network density ranks among the top central cities in the country. As of 2019, the total mileage of Nanjing highways opened to traffic has reached 630 kilometers, and the highway network density has reached 9.56 kilometers per 100 square kilometers, ranking first in the country.

With Nanjing as the center, Ninghu, Ninggao, Ningzhen, Ningyang, Ningchu, Ninglian, Ningtong, Ningchao, Ninghe, Ningluo, Ningma, Ningxuan, Ningyan, Ninghuai, Ningmu, Ningchang, Ninghang and other high-grade highways lead to Jiang surrounding provinces and cities in a radial pattern. Among them, national expressways include G25 Changshen Expressway (Ninghang Expressway), G36 Ningluo Expressway, G40 Shanghai-Shaanxi Expressway (Ninghe Expressway), G42 Shanghai-Rongming Expressway (Shanghai-Nanjing Expressway), G4211 Ningwu Expressway (Ningma Expressway) And G2501 Nanjing Ring Expressway, the national roads include 104 national highway, 205 national highway, 312 national highway, and 328 national highway.

Main long-distance bus terminals: Nanjing Bus Station, Nanjing South Bus Station, Nanjing North Bus Station, Nanjing East Bus Station, Jiangning Bus Station, Lishui Bus Station, Gaochun Bus Station, Nanjing Getang Bus Station.

{G1xx (which starts from Beijing), G2xx (north-south), G3xx (west-east)}:
China National Highway 104—motorists can either drive northwest to Beijing or south to Fuzhou, Fujian.
China National Highway 205—motorists can either drive north to Shanhaiguan, Hebei or south to Shenzhen, Guangdong.
China National Highway 312—motorists can either drive east to Shanghai or west to Khorgas, Xinjiang on the Kazakh border
China National Highway 328—Nanjing is the western terminus of G328, which motorists can follow to Hai'an County in eastern Jiangsu

Public transport

The city also boasts an efficient public transport network, which mainly consists of bus, taxi and metro systems. The bus network, which is currently run by three companies since 2011, provides more than 370 routes covering all parts of the city and suburban areas. They are Line 1, Line 2, Line 3, Line 4, Line 7, Line 10, Line S1, Line S3, Line S6, Line S7, Line S8 and Line S9. The city is planning to complete a 17-line Metro and light-rail system by 2030. The expansion of the Metro network will greatly facilitate intracity transport and reduce the currently heavy traffic congestion.

Metro 
Nanjing's first subway officially opened on September 3, 2005. It is the sixth city in mainland China to open a subway. As of 2019, Nanjing subway has 12 lines and 208 stations, with a total length of 449 kilometers and an average daily passenger flow. With more than 3.4 million passengers, the length of subway lines ranks seventh in China (after Beijing, Shanghai, Guangzhou, Chengdu, Hangzhou and Shenzhen) and eighth in the world.

Bus 
At present, Nanjing has eliminated buses below the National III standard and non-air-conditioned buses, and the number of pure electric buses ranks second in the world.

Taxi 
As of the end of 2019, there were more than 12,000 real-name certified taxis in Nanjing. The appearance of the taxis was mostly uniform yellow and black, and the royal blue luxury taxis were a minority. At present, there are four types of taxi tariff standards in Nanjing: ordinary car 11 yuan / 3 kilometers, base price 2.4 yuan / km for car kilometers; mid-range car 11 yuan / 2.5 kilometers, 2.9 yuan / km; high-end cars 11 Yuan / 2 km, 2.9 Yuan / km; pure electric vehicles 11 Yuan / 2.5 km, 2.9 yuan / km.

Online car-hailing 
As of July 2019, there are 6 online ride-hailing platforms in Nanjing, namely Meituan Taxi, Didi Chuxing, First Taxi-hailing, Cao Cao Special Car, Shenzhou Special Car, T3 Travel, and the current car qualification rate of each platform is 70% the above. At present, there are about 13,000 online car-hailing vehicles legally applying for "car permits" in Nanjing.

Tram 
As of 2019, there are 2 lines of Nanjing trams. Nanjing Hexi Tram was officially put into operation on August 1, 2014. It is the world's first inter-area contactless tram, and China's first tram to be charged at a station. The line is about 7.76 kilometers long and has 13 stations., Including 4 subway transfer stations. The Nanjing Kylin Tram was officially put into operation on October 31, 2017. The line is about 8.95 kilometers long and has 15 stations, including 1 subway transfer station.

Air

Nanjing's airport, Lukou International Airport NKG, serves both national and international flights. In 2013, Nanjing airport handled 15,011,792 passengers and 255,788.6 tonnes of freight. The airport currently has 85 routes to national and international destinations, which include Japan, Korea, Thailand, Malaysia, Singapore, United States and Germany. The airport is connected by a  highway directly to the city center, and is also linked to various intercity highways, making it accessible to the passengers from the surrounding cities. A railway Ninggao Intercity Line has been built to link the airport with Nanjing South Railway Station. Lukou Airport was opened on 28 June 1997, replacing Nanjing Dajiaochang Airport as the main airport serving Nanjing. Dajiaochang Airport is still used as a military air base. Nanjing has another airport – Nanjing Ma'an International Airport which temporarily serves as a dual-use military and civil airport.

Soil 
There are mainly two types of soil in Nanjing: zonal soil and cultivated soil. The zonal soil is yellow-brown soil in the northern and central areas of Nanjing, and red soil in the southern part of the border with Anhui. The cultivated soil formed by man-made farming is mainly paddy soil, and there are some yellow Gang soil and vegetable garden soil. The distribution of soil presents a certain law with the undulation of topography and hydrological conditions, which can be divided into three categories: low mountain and hilly area, hilly area and plain area. According to the second national soil survey from 1980 to 1987, the soil in Nanjing is divided into 7 soil types, 13 subtypes, 30 soil genera and 66 soil species, with a total area of 416,300 hectares.

Water
Nanjing is located at the lower reaches of the Yangtze River. The Yangtze River runs diagonally across the city from southwest to northeast. It is about 93 kilometers long and more than 300 kilometers away from the sea entrance. The Qinhuai River rushes from south to north, passes through the main urban area, and joins the Yangtze River. It is known as the mother river of Nanjing. Xuanwu Lake and Mochou Lake are like two pearls embedded in the main city. The water area of the city now accounts for about 11%. The river and lake water system mainly belongs to the Yangtze River system, and only the rivers that flow into Gaoyou Lake and Baoying Lake in the northern part of Liuhe District belong to the Huai River system. The Yangtze River system includes the Qinhuai River system in the south of the Yangtze River, the Chuhe River system in the north of the Yangtze River, the riverside system formed by small rivers that flow into the river on both sides of the river, the two lakes system composed of Shijiu Lake and Gucheng Lake, and the West Taihu Lake system in the east of Gaochun. The groundwater resources are abundant and the water quality is excellent, and the Pukou Pearl Spring is particularly famous. Jiangning Tangshan and Pukou Tangquan are hot spring areas with a long history.

The Port of Nanjing is the largest inland port in China, with annual cargo tonnage reached 191,970,000 t in 2012. Nanjing is also the biggest container port along the Yangtze River; in March 2004, the one million container-capacity base, Longtan Containers Port Area opened, further consolidating Nanjing as the leading port in the region. , it operated six public ports and three industrial ports. The Yangtze River's 12.5-meter-deep waterway enables 50,000-ton-class ocean ships directly arrive at the Nanjing Port, and the ocean ships with the capacities of 100,000 tons or above can also reach the port after load reduction in the Yangtze River's high-tide period. CSC Jinling has a large shipyard.

Animal and plant resources 
Nanjing is one of the regions with abundant plant resources and a wide variety of plants in China. The vegetation types are complex, including 7 types of natural vegetation including coniferous forest, deciduous broad-leaved forest, mixed deciduous and evergreen broad-leaved forest, bamboo forest, shrub, grass and aquatic vegetation. Cultivated vegetation includes field crops, vegetable crops, and economic forests, orchards and green belts. Plant species, there are 1061 species of vascular plants, accounting for 64.7% of the total in Jiangsu Province. Seven species such as Sphaerocarpus sinensis, Chinese Allium chinense, Ming Codonopsis, and Pterocarpus sinensis are national key protected rare and endangered plants. The city's forest coverage rate is 27.1%. Among wild animals, there are 795 species of insects belonging to 125 families of 11 orders. There are 99 species of fish belonging to 22 families and 12 orders. There are 327 species of terrestrial wild vertebrates, belonging to 29 orders and 90 families. 243 species of birds belong to 56 families of 17 orders. 47 species of mammals belong to 8 orders and 22 families. Among all animal species, 9 species of wild animals under national first-level protection, such as the Oriental White Crane and White Shoulder Eagle, 65 species of wild animals under the second-level protection, such as the little swan, Chinese tiger and swallowtail, and finless porpoise, and 125 key protected animals in Jiangsu Province Species, 35 species of endangered animals.

Yangtze River crossings

In the 1960s, the first Nanjing Yangtze River Bridge was completed, and served as the only bridge crossing over the Lower Yangtze in eastern China at that time. The bridge was a source of pride and an important symbol of modern China, having been built and designed by the Chinese themselves following failed surveys by other nations and the reliance on and then rejection of Soviet expertise. Begun in 1960 and opened to traffic in 1968, the bridge is a two-tiered road and rail design spanning  on the upper deck, with approximately  spanning the river itself.  Since then four more bridges and four tunnels have been built.  Going in the downstream direction, the Yangtze crossings in Nanjing are: Dashengguan Bridge, Third Bridge, Fifth Nanjing Yangtze River Bridge, Nanjing Yangtze River Tunnel, Line 10 Metro Tunnel, Nanjing Yangtze Tunnel, First Bridge, Yanziji Yangtze River Tunnel, Second Bridge and Fourth Bridge.

Mineral resources 
Nanjing is rich in mineral resources. The discovered minerals mainly include 41 types of iron, copper, lead, zinc, strontium, ferrosulfide, dolomite, limestone, gypsum, and clay, among which 23 are of proven reserves and 20 are of industrial mining value. There are more than 10 kinds being mined. The quality and reserves of strontium ore (celestite) rank first in the country. The reserves of copper and lead-zinc ore account for more than 90% of the province, iron ore accounts for 89% of the province, and limestone, dolomite, and attapulgite clay mines are in the whole province. Province occupies an important position. Nanjing's minerals are mainly concentrated in 4 metallogenic belts, namely Jiangpu-Liuhe iron and copper metallogenic belt, Ningzhen iron, copper, and sulfur polymetallic metallogenic belt, Ningwu iron, copper.

Scenic spots 
Nanjing is located in the Yang hilly area of Ningzhen Town, with low hills and gentle hills, dragons and tigers, thousands of miles of Yangtze River passing through the city, Qixia Mountain, Mufu Mountain, Lion Mountain, Qingliang Mountain, Jilong Mountain, Niushou Mountain, and other surrounding urban areas, Qinhuai Rivers, Xuanwu Lake, Huashen Lake and Mochou Lake are dotted around, creating a wonderful landscape with mountains, water, city, and forests as the big pattern. As an ancient capital with splendid cultural traditions and rich historical heritage, it has nurtured numerous cultural landscapes. The Ming people have the chant of "Jinling Forty Scenery", the Qing people have the saying of "Jinling Forty-Eight Scenery", spring outing "Niu Shou Yan Lan", summer "Zhong Fu Qingyun", autumn "Qixia Holy Land"

As of the end of 2019, Nanjing had 1 World Cultural Heritage, 2 World Cultural Heritage Preliminary List, 516 cultural relics protection units at the city level and above, including 112 national key cultural relics protection units, 114 provincial cultural relics protection units 126 points, 353 municipal-level cultural relics protection units, 347 sites, 2 national-level historical and cultural blocks, 11 provincial-level historical and cultural blocks, 3 national-level historical and cultural towns (villages), 51 national-level tourist attractions, including 4A-level There are 26 scenic spots above, including 2 five-A-level scenic spots and 24 four-A-level scenic spots. One world cultural heritage is Ming Xiaoling Mausoleum, two national historical and cultural blocks are Nanjing MeiyuanXincun block and Yihe Road block, and three national historical and cultural towns (villages) are Chunxi Town, Gaochun District, Nanjing City. Qiqiao Village, Qiqiao Town, Gaochun District, Yangliu Village, Hushu Street, Jiangning District. The two five-A-level scenic spots are Confucius Temple-Qinhuai Scenic Belt Scenic Area and Zhongshan Scenic Area. 24 four-A-level scenic spots include Yuhuatai Scenic Area, Presidential Palace Scenic Area, Yuejiang Tower Scenic Area, Xuanwu Lake Scenic Area, Chaotian Palace Scenic Area, etc.

Economic industry

Overview 
In 1981, Nanjing was listed as one of the 15 economic center cities by the country. In 2004, Nanjing ranked sixth in China's economic center positioning index, second only to Beijing, Shanghai, Guangzhou, Shenzhen, and Tianjin. In 2008, the headquarters economy development capacity ranked fifth in China, behind Beijing, Shanghai, Guangzhou, and Shenzhen. In 2014 China's regional central cities (excluding Beijing and Shanghai) competitiveness evaluation, Nanjing was second only to Shenzhen and Guangzhou. In 2015, Nanjing ranked fifth in China's investment attractive cities, closely following Beijing, Shanghai, Guangzhou, and Shenzhen. In August 2020, Nanjing ranked among China's top ten GDP in the first half of the year.

In 2019, Nanjing's GDP was 1403,015 billion yuan, ranking 11th in the country, an increase of 7.8% over the previous year. The per capita GDP is 152,886 yuan, ranking second in China's municipalities, sub-provincial cities and provincial capitals, second only to Shenzhen, and the provincial capital ranking first.In 2021, nanjing's GDP reached 1,6355.32 billion yuan.

Primary industry 
Nanjing is one of China's important agricultural and commercial grain bases. The main cash crops are rice, cotton, silkworm cocoons, hemp, tea, bamboo, fruits, medicinal materials, etc. Due to the fertile water quality on both sides of the Yangtze River, it is also one of China's important freshwater fishery bases.

In 2019, the total output value of Nanjing's agriculture, forestry, animal husbandry, and fishery was 47.250 billion yuan, an increase of 4.8% over the previous year. Among them, the agricultural output value was 24.077 billion yuan, the forestry output value was 2.017 billion yuan, the animal husbandry output value was 2.435 billion yuan, the fishery output value was 15.389 billion yuan, and the agricultural, forestry, animal husbandry and fishery service industry output value was 3.333 billion yuan.

Secondary industry 
Nanjing is the cradle of modern Chinese industry. As the starting place of the Westernization Movement in the late Qing Dynasty and the capital of the Republic of China, Nanjing has played a pivotal role in the Chinese industrial system since the middle of the 19th century, and is a model of modern Chinese urban industrialization and modernization transformation. The birth of Jinling Manufacturing Bureau in 1865 marked the beginning of Nanjing's modern industry. A number of well-known enterprises such as Hutchison International, Jinpu Railway South Section Machine Factory (predecessor of Nanjing Puzhen Rolling Stock Factory), Yongli Chemical Industry Co., Ltd. (predecessor of Nanjing Chemical Industry Company), and China Cement Plant have been completed and put into operation successively, forming Nanjing The embryonic form of modern industry.

Since the reform and opening up, Nanjing has become an important national comprehensive industrial production base, modern service center, and advanced manufacturing base, as well as a national pilot zone for the integration of informatization and industrialization.

In 2019, Nanjing's total industrial added value was 421.577 billion yuan, an increase of 6.9%. The added value of industrial enterprises above the designated size was 309.226 billion yuan, an increase of 7.0%. Among the industries above designated size, the added value of state-owned and state-holding enterprises fell by 0.2%, private enterprises increased by 20.3%, and foreign companies, Hong Kong, Macao, and Taiwan enterprises increased by 7.0%. Large and medium-sized enterprises increased by 3.9%, and small and micro enterprises increased by 18.2%. Among the 37 major industries in the system, 22 industries have achieved growth in added value. Among the top ten industries ranked by cumulative value-added, six industries including electronics, electrical machinery, steel, medicine, general equipment, and non-metal products increased by 20.2%,

Tertiary industry 
Nanjing is an important regional financial and business center positioned by the National Development and Reform Commission. The financial industry is an important strategic pillar industry in Nanjing. The total financial volume and financial resources account for 25% of Jiangsu Province, and the financial center index ranks sixth in the country. In the 2018 China Financial Center Index evaluation, Nanjing's financial industry performance ranked fourth in China, second only to Beijing, Shanghai, and Shenzhen. In 2018, Nanjing's financial industry achieved an added value of 147.332 billion yuan, and the balance of domestic and foreign currency deposits in financial institutions was 3452.486 billion yuan.

Nanjing is China's service outsourcing base and national software export innovation base. It is China's only pilot city for comprehensive reform of the national science and technology system. The software industry is the number one leading industry and pillar industry that Nanjing strives to cultivate. At the end of 2019, Nanjing achieved a total execution value of 17.33 billion US dollars in service outsourcing, ranking first among Chinese cities. In 2018, the software and information service industry had a revenue of 450 billion yuan, ranking fourth in China and first in Jiangsu after Beijing, Shenzhen, and Shanghai, accounting for 7.1% of the country's total and 50.8% of Jiangsu's. There are 12 unicorn companies in Nanjing in 2019, ranking seventh in global cities and fifth in China.

The convention and exhibition industry is an important industry in Nanjing. In the "World 2013 City Conference Industry Development Ranking" issued by the International Conference and Convention Association (ICCA), Nanjing has become the city with the most international conferences in China after Beijing and Shanghai. In 2019, Beichen Convention and Exhibition Research Institute released the "China Exhibition Index Report 2019", and Nanjing ranked seventh in China in the comprehensive index of domestic urban exhibition industry development. According to the "2017 China Exhibition Statistics Report" released in 2018, Nanjing ranked third in the number of exhibitions held in all cities in China, and ranked fifth in the exhibition area in all cities in China.

Culture and art

Being one of the four ancient capitals of China, Nanjing has always been a cultural center attracting intellectuals from all over the country. In the Tang and Song dynasties, Nanjing was a place where poets gathered and composed poems reminiscent of its luxurious past; during the Ming and Qing dynasties, the city was the official imperial examination center (Jiangnan Examination Hall) for the Jiangnan region, again acting as a hub where different thoughts and opinions converged and thrived.

Today, with a long cultural tradition and strong support from local educational institutions, Nanjing is commonly viewed as a "city of culture" and one of the more pleasant cities to live in China.

Art

Some of the leading art groups of China are based in Nanjing; they include the Qianxian Dance Company, Nanjing Dance Company, Nanjing Little Red Flower Art Troupe, Jiangsu Peking Opera Institute and Nanjing Xiaohonghua Art Company among others.

Jiangsu Province Kun Opera is one of the best theaters for Kunqu, China's oldest stage art.
It is considered a conservative and traditional troupe. Nanjing also has professional opera troupes for the Yang, Yue (shaoxing), Xi and Jing (Chinese opera varieties) as well as Suzhou pingtan, spoken theater and puppet theater.

Jiangsu Art Gallery is the largest gallery in Jiangsu Province, presenting some of the best traditional and contemporary art pieces of China like the historical Master Ho-Kan; many other smaller-scale galleries, such as Red Chamber Art Garden and Jinling Stone Gallery, also have their own special exhibitions. As of 2019, Nanjing has 14 cultural centers, 100 cultural stations, 15 public libraries (excluding libraries for education systems and enterprises and institutions), 132 movie theaters, and 2 large-scale convention and exhibition centers. They are Nanjing International Exhibition Center and Nanjing International Expo Center, 87 various museums, including 77 state-owned museums and 10 non-state-owned museums. As of the end of August 2020, there are 137 calligraphy and painting academies, art museums, and art galleries in Nanjing.

Nanjing is an important town of Chinese painting and calligraphy. In the Six Dynasties, there were painting and calligraphy masters such as Wang Xizhi, Wang Xianzhi, Zhang Sengyou, Lu Tanwei, and Gu Kaizhi. The earliest extant painting theory work "Paintings" has a profound impact on later generations. The Nantang Art Academy brought together outstanding calligraphy and painting masters at a time. Dongyuan and Juran pioneered the Southern School of Landscape and became a generation of masters. Xu Xi's flower and bird paintings, Zhou Wenju, and Gu Hongzhong's figure paintings continue to pass. "Han Xizai's Night Banquet" is a masterpiece of ancient Chinese meticulous brushwork. The system of Nantang Painting Academy was also inherited by later generations. The Painting Book of Ten Bamboo Studios in the Ming Dynasty reproduced the paintings with the pinnacle of three-dimensional color printing techniques. The Painting Book of Mustard Seed Garden in the early Qing Dynasty was regarded as a must-read for learning Chinese painting. The "Eight Masters of Nanjing" headed by Gong Xian were active in Nanjing in the early Qing Dynasty and created the Jinling School of Painting. In the 1930s, celebrities in painting circles such as Lv Fengzi, Xu Beihong, Zhang Daqian, Yan Wenliang, Lu Sibai, Chen Zhifo, Gao Jianfu, Pan Yuliang, and Pang Xunqin gathered in Nanjing. Among them, Xu Beihong, Zhang Shuqi, and Liu Zigu were hailed as the "Three Masters of Jinling". Contemporary "New Jinling Painting School" represented by Fu Baoshi, Qian Songyan, Song Wenzhi, Wei Zixi, Yaming,

Festivals

Many traditional festivals and customs were observed in the old times, which included climbing the City Wall on January 16, bathing in Qing Xi on March 3, hill hiking on September 9 and others (the dates are in Chinese lunar calendar). Almost none of them, however, are still celebrated by modern Nanjingese.

Instead, Nanjing, as a tourist destination, hosts a series of government-organized events throughout the year. The annual International Plum Blossom Festival held in Plum Blossom Hill, the largest plum collection in China, attracts thousands of tourists both domestically and internationally. Other events include Nanjing Baima Peach Blossom and Kite Festival, Jiangxin Zhou Fruit Festival and Linggu Temple Sweet Osmanthus Festival.

Libraries
Nanjing Library, founded in 1907, houses more than 10 million volumes of printed materials and is the third largest library in China, after the National Library in Beijing and Shanghai Library. Other libraries, such as city-owned Jinling Library and various district libraries, also provide considerable amount of information to citizens. Nanjing University Library is the second largest university libraries in China after Peking University Library, and the fifth largest nationwide, especially in the number of precious collections.

Museums

Nanjing has some of the oldest and finest museums in China. Nanjing Museum, formerly known as National Central Museum during ROC period, is the first modern museum and remains as one of the leading museums in China having 400,000 items in its permanent collection. The museum is notable for enormous collections of Ming and Qing imperial porcelain, which is among the largest in the world.
Other museums include the City Museum of Nanjing in the Chaotian Palace, the Oriental Metropolitan Museum, the China Modern History Museum in the Presidential Palace, the Nanjing Massacre Memorial Hall, the Taiping Kingdom History Museum, Jiangning Imperial Silk Manufacturing Museum, Nanjing Yunjin Museum, Nanjing City Wall Cultural Museum, Nanjing Customs Museum in Ganxi House, Nanjing Astronomical History Museum, Nanjing Paleontological Museum, Nanjing Geological Museum, Nanjing Riverstones Museum, and other museums and memorials such Zheng He Memorial Jinling Four Modern Calligraphers Memorial.

Theater
Most of Nanjing's major theaters are multi-purpose, used as convention halls, cinemas, musical halls and theaters on different occasions. The major theaters include the People's Convention Hall and the Nanjing Arts and Culture Center. The Capital Theater well known in the past is now a museum in theater/film.

Night life

Traditionally Nanjing's nightlife was mostly centered around Nanjing Fuzimiao (Confucius Temple) area along the Qinhuai River, where night markets, restaurants and pubs thrived. Boating at night in the river was a main attraction of the city. Thus, one can see the statues of the famous teachers and educators of the past not too far from those of the courtesans who educated the young men in the other arts.

In the past 20 years, several commercial streets have been developed, hence the nightlife has become more diverse: there are shopping malls opening late in the Xinjiekou CBD, as well as in and around major residential areas throughout the city. The well-established "Nanjing 1912" district hosts a wide variety of recreational facilities ranging from traditional restaurants and western pubs to dance clubs, in both its downtown location and beside Baijia Lake in Jiangning District. In recent years, many night-life options have opened up in Catherine Park as well as in shopping malls such as IST in Xinjiekou and Kingmo near Baijai Lake metro station. Other, more student-oriented places are to be found near to Nanjing University and Nanjing Normal University.

Food and symbolism

The local cuisine in Nanjing is called Jinling cuisine or Jingsu cuisine (京苏菜); it is part of Jiangsu province's cuisine.  Jinling cuisine is famous for its meticulous process, emphasizing no added preservatives and its seasonality. Its duck and goose dishes are well known among Chinese for centuries.  It also employs many different style of cooking methods, such as slow cooking, Chinese oven cooking, etc. Its dishes tend to be light and fresh, suitable for all. The restaurant specializing in Jinling cuisine is Ma Xiang Xing (马祥兴菜馆).

Many of the city's local favorite dishes are based on ducks, including Nanjing salted duck, duck blood and vermicelli soup, and duck oil pancake.

The radish is also a typical food representing people of Nanjing, which has been spread through word of mouth as an interesting fact for many years in China. According to Nanjing.GOV.cn, "There is a long history of growing radish in Nanjing especially the southern suburb. In the spring, the radish tastes very juicy and sweet. It is well-known that people in Nanjing like eating radish. And the people are even addressed as 'Nanjing big radish', which means they are unsophisticated, passionate and conservative. From health perspective, eating radish can help to offset the stodgy food that people take during the Spring Festival".

Sports and stadiums

Nanjing is the birthplace of modern Chinese sports. In 1910, the first National Games in Chinese history was held. In 1924, the predecessor of the Chinese Olympic Committee (All-China Sports Association) was established in Nanjing. China's first Olympic delegation trained, assembled, and set off in Nanjing. Nanjing is the birthplace of China's Olympic dream and one of the cities that contributed the most to China's participation in the Olympics. Nanjing has an irreplaceable position in the history of the Chinese Olympics.

Nanjing's planned 20,000 seat Youth Olympic Sports Park Gymnasium will be one of the venues for the 2019 FIBA Basketball World Cup.

As a major Chinese city, Nanjing is home to many professional sports teams. 2020 Chinese Super League champions Jiangsu Football Club, owned by Suning Appliance Group, was a tenant of Nanjing Olympic Sports Center from 2007 until the club's dissolution in 2021. Jiangsu Nangang Basketball Club is a competitive team which has long been one of the major clubs fighting for the title in China top-level league, CBA. Jiangsu Volleyball men and women teams are also traditionally considered as at top level in China volleyball league.

There are two major sports centers in Nanjing, Wutaishan Sports Center and Nanjing Olympic Sports Center. Both of these two are comprehensive sports centers, including stadium, gymnasium, natatorium, tennis court, etc. Wutaishan Sports Center was established in 1952 and it was one of the oldest and most advanced stadiums in early time of People's Republic of China.

Nanjing hosted the 10th National Games of PRC in 2005 and hosted the 2nd summer Youth Olympic Games in 2014.

In 2005, to host The 10th National Game of People's Republic of China, there was a new stadium, Nanjing Olympic Sports Center, constructed in Nanjing. Compared to Wutaishan Sports Center, which the major stadium's capacity is 18,500, Nanjing Olympic Sports Center has a more advanced stadium which is big enough to seat 60,000 spectators. Its gymnasium has capacity of 13,000, and natatorium of capacity 3,000.

On 10 February 2010, the 122nd IOC session at Vancouver announced Nanjing as the host city for the 2nd Summer Youth Olympic Games. The slogan of the 2014 Youth Olympic Games was "Share the Games, Share our Dreams". The Nanjing 2014 Youth Olympic Games featured all 28 sports on the Olympic program and were held from 16 to 28 August. The 2014 Nanjing Youth Olympic Games is another major Olympic event hosted by China after the Beijing Olympics. It is the first time that China has hosted the Youth Olympic Games and the second time that China has hosted an Olympic event. The hosting of the Youth Olympic Games makes Nanjing the second city in the Greater China region after Beijing that has hosted athletes from more than 200 countries and regions. In the ranking of the most dynamic cities in China in 2015, Nanjing ranked third, second only to Beijing and Shanghai. According to the ranking of the top 100 global sports influences published by SPORTCAL, an authoritative sports market intelligence research and service organization in the United Kingdom, Nanjing ranks 10th in the world and 2nd in China, second only to Beijing.

The Nanjing Youth Olympic Games Organizing Committee (NYOGOC) worked together with the International Olympic Committee (IOC) to attract the best young athletes from around the world to compete at the highest level. Off the competition fields, an integrated culture and education program focused on discussions about education, Olympic values, social challenges, and cultural diversity. The YOG aims to spread the Olympic spirit and encourage sports participation.

Main venues: Nanjing Olympic Sports Center, Wutaishan Sports Center, Youth Olympic Sports Park, Nanjing Institute of Physical Education (Central Stadium), Nanjing Longjiang Stadium, Nanjing National Fitness Center, Jiangning Sports Center, Lishui Sports Center, Gaochun Sports Center, etc.

Main teams: Jiangsu Football Club (dissolved), Nanjing Monkey Kings, Jiangsu Dragons (a.k.a. Jiangsu Nangang), etc.

Architecture 
The city is renowned for its wide variety of architectures which mainly contain buildings from multiple dynasties, the Republic of China, and the present.

Imperial period

Inside the walled city 
City Wall of Nanjing
Gate of China (Zhonghuamen)
Fuzimiao (Confucius Temple) and Qinhuai River
Jiangnan Examination Hall
Zhanyuan Garden
Old Gate East (Laomendong)
Taoye Ferry
Ming Palace Site
Xu Garden
Jiming Temple
Beiji Ge
Drum Tower of Nanjing
Chaotian Palace
Stone City
Yuejiang Tower
Jinghai Temple

Outside the walled city 
Purple Mountain Scenic Area
Ming Xiaoling Mausoleum and its surrounding complex
Linggu Temple
Xuanwu Lake
Qixia Temple
The Porcelain Pagoda of Nanjing (restored)
Mochou Lake and Park
Yangshan Quarry
Southern Tang Mausoleums

City symbol 
City Tree: Cedar

City Flower: Plum

Tourist city symbol: Long Pan Tiger Standing

Languages 
Nanjing Mandarin is spoken in most parts of Nanjing, while Wu Chinese is spoken in most of the Gaochun District and the southern part of Lishui District.

Nanjing dialect has been the official language of China for a long time in history. Jinling Yayan was established as the standard pronunciation of Chinese as an orthodox traditional Chinese dialect in the ancient Central Plains. It has a profound influence on the Chinese language form to this day, and the Han culture since the Six Dynasties. For the superior consciousness of the above, the official Chinese standard language of the dynasties before the middle of the Qing Dynasty was based on Nanjing Mandarin. The Chinese language taught and used in neighboring countries such as Japan, North Korea, and Vietnam is also Nanjing Mandarin. Western missionaries who came to China during the Ming and Qing dynasties used Nanjing Mandarin as the standard Chinese dialect. The "Chinese Zhengyin Conference" hosted by Western missionaries in the early years of the Republic of China also adopted the Nanjing accent as the standard. For a long time, the Nanjing dialect has been admired for its elegant, smooth, accent, and unique status.

In July 2017, the Ministry of Education and the National Language Commission held a press conference, and the penetration rate of Mandarin has reached 73%. The protection of the Nanjing dialect should start from the baby. Nanjing has initiated the Nanjing dialect to campus plan, and will take the lead in adding the content of "Old Nanjing dialect" to the extracurricular activities of elementary schools; at the same time, the Nanjing dialect speaker Chen Zongxia established the "Talk to Nanjing" studio. So far, 6 sessions of children's dialect training courses have been held, and they have been invited to the middle class of Nanjing No. 1 Experimental Kindergarten, where more than 200 children were trained in Nanjing dialects, old children's songs, and old games; Nanjing Local History Museum invited Chen Zongxia to write articles for them and put some videos on the Internet for dissemination, which related to Nanjing yelling, like Baiju; in terms of new media, the "hard leg" studio familiar to young people has been recording videos and dubbing in Nanjing dialect, set off the trend of “Nanjing-style humor” by tapping local cultural resources.

Religion 
Nanjing has four major religions: Buddhism, Taoism, Christianity, and Islam. Nanjing is one of the earliest areas in China to spread Buddhist culture. The "480 Temples in the Southern Dynasties" has become the center of Chinese Buddhist culture and the ancestral home of the Sanlunzong, Niutouzong, Fayanzong, and other Buddhist sects. Nanjing is also the place for the revival of modern Chinese Buddhist culture. The Jinling Carved Scriptures integrates Buddhist publishing, dissemination, and research. It is still the world's unparalleled Chinese Buddhist scripture publishing and circulation center. The engraving and printing skills are included in the world's intangible cultural heritage of humanity. Ancient famous temples such as Jianchu Temple, Qixia Temple, Waguan Temple, Qingliang Temple, Jiming Temple, Dabaoen Temple, etc. were revived. Nanjing Taoism has a long history and occupies an important position in the history of Chinese Taoism. The history of the spread of Catholicism in Nanjing began more than 400 years ago by the scientist and missionary Matteo Ricci. The Shigu Road Catholic Church is the cathedral of the Catholic Diocese of Nanjing. The Nanjing Diocese with Nanjing as its center has a vast area. As one of the national centers of Christianity in China, Nanjing has two seminaries, Jinling Theological Seminary and Jiangsu Theological Seminary. The Christian social service organization Amity Foundation and the world's largest Bible printing company Amity Printing Company are both in Nanjing. Nanjing is the birthplace of the Islamic "Renaissance" and has an important influence on the development of Chinese Islamic culture.

Folklore 
The main folklore activities in Nanjing include Chinese New Year greetings for the Spring Festival, hanging Spring Festival couplets at the city gate, eating rice cakes, welcoming the God of Wealth on the fifth day of the first lunar month, climbing the city on the 16th day of the first lunar month, sweeping the tomb on Qingming Festival, dragon boat races on the Dragon Boat Festival, eating rice dumplings, and begging for gifts on Qixi Festival, Liqiu gnawing autumn, Mid-Autumn reunion, eating moon cakes, enjoy the moon and go to the melon rack in the field and pick melon beans under the bean shed, Chongyang ascends, Chongyang cake inserted Chongyang flag, Laba food porridge, sent stove on the 24th lunar month, New Year's Eve reunion and ancestor worship.

Diet 
Nanjing's food culture has a long history. During the pre-Qin period, it was distinguished from the Central Plains culture with "fandao soup fish". Nanjing people like to eat wild vegetables during the Qingming Festival, and they named the eight most eaten spring vegetables and wild vegetables as the "Eight Dry Seasons". There is also the saying "Eight fresh sweet-scented osmanthus fragrance", referring to 8 kinds of aquatic fruits and vegetables during the Mid-Autumn Festival. Nanjing people like to eat ducks. Nanjing salted duck, roast duck, and dried duck have won the reputation of "Duck Capital" and "Finest duck under Heaven". The flavor snacks of Jinling Tea House have become an indispensable part of Qinhuai culture. In addition, Jiangning, Liuhe and Gaochun each have their own local flavors. "Suiyuan Food List", "Baimen Recipe", "Yecheng Vegetable Book" are the crystallization of Nanjing food culture. Jinling Hotel, Jiangsu Restaurant, Ma Xiangxing, Lvliuju, etc. are all committed to the inheritance of Nanjing's dining culture and create Jinling dishes with their own characteristics and meet contemporary needs.

Literature 
The first "Literature Museum" in Chinese history, the first literary theory and criticism monograph "Wen Xin Diao Long", the earliest existing collection of poetry and essays "Selected Works of Zhaoming", China's first poetic theory and criticism monograph "Shi Pin" ", the first collection of zhiren novel," Shi Shuo Xin Yu, "and the first children's enlightenment book "Thousand Characters "were all born in Nanjing. Masterpieces such as "A Dream of Red Mansions" and "The Scholars" are inseparable from Nanjing.

Modern literary giants such as Lu Xun, Ba Jin, Zhu Ziqing, Yu Pingbo, Zhang Henshui, Zhang Ailing have inextricably linked with Nanjing, and the masterpiece "The Earth" by the American writer Pearl Buck who won the Nobel Prize for Literature was created in Nanjing. Famous contemporary literary writers in Nanjing include Su Tong, Bi Feiyu and Ye Zhaoyan. Among them, Su Tong, who grew up in Nanjing, is a representative contemporary avant-garde literature writer. His work "The Yellow Bird" won the Mao Dun Literature Award in 2015; Bi Feiyu, who graduated from Nanjing University, is a representative writer of China's "new generation", and his "Tuina" won The 8th Mao Dun Literary Award; Ye Zhaoyan, born in Nanjing, is a representative writer of "New Realism" in China. He won the National Excellent Novella Award from 1987 to 1988 and the first Jiangsu Literature and Art Award. His representative works include "Nanjing Biography" "Flower Shadow" "Mooring on River Qinhuai at night" and so on. Nanjing has always been an important hub for Sino-foreign literary exchanges, and also a bridgehead for traditional Chinese literary masterpieces to the world stage.

Film and television 
Nanjing, as the ancient capital of the Six Dynasties and a famous scenic spot, has become the "best location" favored by directors. Among them, the 93 edition of "Legend of the New White Lady" was shot at Jiming Temple in Nanjing; "Deep Love and Rain" shot at Nanjing Pukou Railway Station; "The Founding of the People's Republic" shot at Sun Yat-sen Mausoleum, Meiling Palace, Southeast University Auditorium, etc. .; and more movies and TV series "Jinling Thirteen Hairpins", "To Our Dying Youth", "Tuina", etc. were all shot in Nanjing.

Music and dance 
Jinling Qin School is an important genre of Chinese Guqin art that originated in Nanjing. It has a great influence on many later generations of Qin Schools. It originated from the Royal Music Officials of the Ming Dynasty and has been listed as a World Intangible Cultural Heritage Project. The folk song "Jasmine Flower" originated from the "Flower Tune" sung by Liuhe folks for a century, and is world-famous. Xishanqiao folk song performances have repeatedly appeared on CCTV. In addition, there are Gaochun folk songs "Caihongling", "Planting Seedlings in May", Liuhe folk songs "Flower Tune", "Liuzuo Blow Music" etc.

In addition to classical music, contemporary Nanjing also has many famous songs. For example, Li Shutong's "Farewell": outside the long pavilion, along the ancient road, green grass and green sky; Li Zhi's "Summer on Shanyin Road": Do you still remember my room on the eighth floor of Shanyin Road, the day and night singing in the room; About Nanjing University's song "University of Nanjing": Today I'm going to say goodbye to Nanjing. The wind that separates us is light but firm. Goodbye Nanjing; the unique Nanjing rap "Drink Wontons": Do you want spicy oil? Do you want spicy oil ?; and the exclusive Nanjing Radio "Nanjing2014" of Nanjing; "Mo Chou ah Mo Chou" that I bleed as a child, etc.

In 2016, the Nanjing Forest Music Carnival, sponsored by the Propaganda Department of the Jiangsu Provincial Party Committee and the Nanjing Municipal People's Government, has been held 5 times. Since 2014, Jiangsu Music Broadcasting will hold the Midou Music Festival in Nanjing every year. The 7th Midou Music Festival; and the popular Nanjing University Student Music Festival in recent years.

Traditional folk dances in Nanjing include Luoshan Dragon, Dongba Dama Lantern, Sparrow Jump, Jiangpu Hand Lion, Gaochun Dance Wuban, Wanbei Xiaoma Lantern Dance, Qixia Dragon Dance, Changlu Carrying Dragon, Tongshan Gaotai Lion Dance, Dongba Peiqiao stilts, Longyin Che, Zhetang Shahuo, Dangdang, Luohan, Zhuzhen stilts are all intangible cultural heritages.

In recent years, Nanjing dancers have been close to life, close to reality, and close to the masses, creating a large number of outstanding dance works. Created by the Nanjing Dancers Association, the original local drama "The Place Closest to Dream", with students from the Department of Music of the School of Aeronautics and Astronautics as the performance team, shows youthful demeanor with the theme of youth entrepreneurship; performed by Nanjing folk performing artists "Drum and Dragon Celebrating the New Year" is a classic of Nanjing folk dance in recent years; the "Nanjing City Intangible Cultural Heritage Scene Demonstration" Jinling Season "hosted by Nanjing Cultural Bureau and undertaken by Nanjing Art Museum is a work of high artistic level.

In Nanjing, we have the first professional children's art school in the country that integrates cultural education, art education and stage performances, Nanjing Art Primary School, referred to as Nanjing Xiaohonghua Art Troupe. The school implements small-class education in an all-round way, and promotes both culture and art. It has been rated as a meritorious unit in Nanjing many times, and twice was awarded the honorary title of "National Children's Cultural Work Advanced Group" by the Central Ministry of Culture.

Drama, Quyi 
Drama includes opera and modern drama.

Xiqu is a traditional Chinese drama. After a long period of development and evolution, it has gradually formed the Chinese Opera Garden with the five major Chinese opera types of "Peking Opera, Yue Opera, Huangmei Opera, Ping Opera, and Henan Opera" as the core. Peking opera has a long history in Nanjing: the famous Peking opera master Mei Baojiu has a deep connection with Nanjing. As the honorary president of the "Nanjing Meilanfang Jingkun Art Research Association", Master Mei Jiubao made a special trip to Nanjing as the "Research Association" "Unveiled, and led his disciples to perform the Meipai famous play" The Return of the Phoenix " Zheng Ziru, the famous Peking opera artist, performed "The Flower Spear" in Nanjing.

Kunqu Opera is one of the oldest operas in traditional Chinese opera, and it is also a treasure of traditional Chinese culture and art, especially opera art. It is called an "orchid" in the Hundred Gardens. In Nanjing, famous professional Kunban classes such as "Xinghua Ministry", "Hualin Ministry", "Li Yujia Ban", and "Cao Yinjia Ban" appeared in Nanjing, and the style of singing songs by the voiceless section and literati also continued.

Drama is a form of Western drama introduced in the 20th century. In recent years, Nanjing's annual drama box office has continued to rise. The drama "Mrs of the Sea" staged in Nanjing in 2017, "Broken Gold", "Treasure Island Village" in 2018, and "Hamlet" in 2019 have the highest box office in the country. All fell in Nanjing. Not only that, the box office and attendance rate of some plays such as "White Deer Plain" in Nanjing are also far ahead in the Yangtze River Delta region.

Quyi is the collective name of the various "rap art" of the Chinese nation. It is a unique art form formed by the long-term development and evolution of folk oral literature and singing art. The local folk arts in Nanjing include Southern Crosstalk, Nanjing Baiju, Nanjing Vernacular, Nanjing Pinghua, Gaochun Yangqiang Mulian Opera, Liuhe Hongshan Opera, etc.

Photography 
Nanjing has many excellent photography works, as well as large-scale photography exhibitions, photography conferences, etc. Zhao Ran's "Quadette of Enchanting Hair", Ben Daochun's "Tianjiang Cruise", Tian Ming's "Shanghai White-collar Early Class Subway Life", Yu Xianyun's "In the Name of the Country" won 21st, 22nd, 23rd, The 25th National Photographic Art Exhibition Gold Award; Liu Jun's "Fisher Songs and Moon" won the 21st Austria Trembler Super Photo Tour Competition Gold Award; Sun Chonglin's "Little Wangmu" Gold Award in the second PSAChina International Photography Competition.

The Nanjing Photographic Association successfully held the third city photography conference in Nanjing; held photography exhibitions such as "World Historical and Cultural Cities", "Hong Kong in the Eyes of Nanjing People", "Nanjing in the Eyes of College Students"; in Italy, Japan, Singapore, and other countries held "Splendid Nanjing" and "Ancient Capital Nanjing" photography exhibitions in Italy, Japan, Singapore, and other countries; held "Harmonious Nanjing", "I Love Nanjing", "Nanjing City Walls", "Four Seasons Jinling" and other photography competitions; edited and published "Nanjing New Look", "Nanjing", "Splendid Nanjing", "Brilliant Nanjing", "Nanjing City Wall" and other large-scale picture albums.

In 2022, the photography competition, "A Decade of Nanjing", organised by Nanjing People’s Association for Friendship with Foreign Countries (NPAFFC), sought to chart the changes in Nanjing through the eyes of foreigners living in the city. Almost half a million online votes were cast to decide the final winners.

Folk crafts 
There are many kinds of folk crafts in Nanjing, including brocade, paper-cutting, lantern color, gold leaf, folding fan, velvet flower, carved velvet, wood carving, bamboo carving, etc.

As of 2019, Nanjing has 4 world human intangible cultural heritage projects (guqin art, Nanjing cloud brocade weaving, Chinese engraving, and printing techniques, Chinese paper-cutting), 11 national intangible cultural heritage projects, 64 Jiangsu Province and 70 Nanjing City intangible cultural heritage project.

Honorary title 
In terms of food, Nanjing has salted duck, duck blood noodles, wonton, fried dumplings, and local specialties of pot stickers; in terms of entertainment, Nanjing has Qixia Mountain, Jiming Temple, Zijin Mountain, and other famous locations; in terms of life, subway transportation bicycles Direct access to almost all areas of Nanjing. Therefore, on November 18, 2020, in the "2020 China's Happiest Cities" survey, Nanjing was awarded one of the happiest cities in China.

Throughout the ages, countless great poets have left in Nanjing the most popular poems, such as Li Bai's "Deng Jinling Phoenix Terrace", Liu Yuxi's "Jinling Five Questions · Stone Man", Du Mu's "Bo Qinhuai", etc., "A Dream of Red Mansions" and "The Scholars Outside History" is inseparable from Nanjing, and there are literary treasures such as the famous novels Homesickness and Paddling Sound in the Qinhuai River in modern times. On October 31, 2019, the official Weibo of the UNESCO Creative City Network announced that Nanjing was listed as the World Literary Capital; City of Literature.

In the Nanjing Massacre that occurred 80 years ago, the Japanese invaders massacred more than 300,000 Chinese soldiers and civilians who had laid down their weapons, and more than 20,000 women were raped. Over the years, Nanjing has adhered to the concept of peace and has done a lot of work to remember history and cherish peace. Therefore, on September 4, the "International Peace City Association" announced to the world through a video that Nanjing became the 169th international peaceful city, and it is also the first and only city in China to join the organization.

Republic of China period
Because it was designated as the national capital, many structures were built around that time. Here is a short list:

Inside the walled city 
Former Presidential Palace of the Republic of China
Former National Assembly Building of the Republic of China
Former Central Government of ROC Building Group along N. Zhongshan Road
Former Central Committee of KMT Buildings
Former Foreign Embassies in Gulou Area
Nanking Officials Residence Cluster along Yihe Road
Former National Central Museum
Former National Art Gallery Building
Former Central Radio of KMT Building
Dahua Theater
Former Academia Sinica Buildings
Former National Central University Buildings at Sipailou
Former University of Nanking Buildings
Former Ginling College Buildings
Former Republic of China Military Academy Buildings
Former Bank of China Nanking Branch Building
Former Bank of Communications Nanking Branch Building
Former Central Bank of ROC Nanking Branch Building
Former Macklin Hospital Buildings (Gulou Hospital)
Former Central Hospital Buildings
St. Paul's Church
Central Hotel
Former Capital Hotel (Huajiang Hotel)
Yangtse Hotel
Lizhishe Buildings

Outside the walled city 
Sun Yat-sen Mausoleum and its surrounding area
National Revolutionary Army Memorial Cemetery
Aviation Martyrs of WWII Memorial Cemetery
National Purple Mountain Observatory
Former Central Stadium
Nanjing Botanical Garden, Memorial Sun Yat-Sen

People's Republic of China period 
Yuhuatai Memorial Park of Revolutionary Martyrs
Nanjing Yangtze River Bridge
Memorial Hall of the Victims in Nanjing Massacre by Japanese Invaders
Jinling Hotel
Zifeng Tower

Education

Ancient education 
Nanjing has been a city that values culture and education since ancient times. As early as the Han Dynasty, Jiangdong private schools were relatively developed. The government-run higher education in Nanjing began in Dong Wu (Eastern Wu). In 258, Emperor Wu Jing ordered doctors of the Five Classics to establish Chinese Studies. In 317, at the beginning of the founding of the Emperor Yuan of Jin, he established Taixue in Jiankang (the highest institution in the country). There are five science museums of literature, history, Confucianism, Xuan, and Yin and Yang in the Southern Song Taixue. It is the first university in the world that integrates education and research. The Southern Tang Dynasty established Taixue, developed imperial examinations, built academies and painting academies, and prospered in writing style. Maoshan Academy of Jiangning Mansion in Song Dynasty was one of the six major academies at that time. In the early Ming Dynasty, Nanjing Guozijian was the largest and highest institution in the world at that time, with nearly 10,000 students, as well as foreign students from Japan, North Korea, Annan, Ryukyu, and other countries studying here. After the capital moved to Yongle, the Nanjing Imperial College was retained, and it was called the Nanjing in history. It not only nurtured students, but also printed books. Chongzheng Academy was well known in the mid-Ming Dynasty. In the Qing Dynasty, Jiang Ningfu School was built, and there were Zhongshan Academy and Xiyin Academy, both of which were taught by famous scholars. In the late Qing Dynasty, Xinxue was promoted, and the Qing court successively opened Jiangnan Industrial School, Jiangnan Wubei School, Jiangnan Lushi School, Jiangnan Navy School, Jinling University of Technology, and other new schools in Nanjing. The American Presbyterian Church opened Mingde College in Nanjing in 1884, and Jinling University Hall was built in 1888. The Sanjiang Normal School, which was organized in 1902 and officially opened in 1904, was the largest and the latest designed after the implementation of the new education in the late Qing Dynasty. It was also one of the earliest normal schools established in modern China. In 1906, it was renamed Liangjiang Normal School (the predecessor of Southeast University, Nanjing University, Nanjing Normal University and other universities). The American Presbyterian Church opened Mingde College in Nanjing in 1884, and Jinling University Hall was built in 1888. The Sanjiang Normal School, which was organized in 1902 and officially opened in 1904, was the largest and the latest designed after the implementation of the new education in the late Qing Dynasty. It was also one of the earliest normal schools established in modern China. In 1906, it was renamed Liangjiang Normal School (the predecessor of Southeast University, Nanjing University, Nanjing Normal University and other universities). The American Presbyterian Church opened Mingde College in Nanjing in 1884, and Jinling University Hall was built in 1888. The Sanjiang Normal School, which was organized in 1902 and officially opened in 1904, was the largest and the latest designed after the implementation of the new education in the late Qing Dynasty. It was also one of the earliest normal schools established in modern China. In 1906, it was renamed Liangjiang Normal School (the predecessor of Southeast University, Nanjing University, Nanjing Normal University and other universities).

As the educational center of southern China for more than 1,700 years, Nanjing has many highly-ranked educational institutions, with the number of universities listed in 147 National Key Universities ranking third (after Beijing and Shanghai). The ratio of college students to the total population ranks No.1 among large cities nationwide. Nanjing has the eighth-largest scientific research output of any city in the world and has been regarded as one of the world's top three scientific research centers in chemistry (behind Beijing and Shanghai), according to the Nature Index. Nanjing was ranked 80th globally by the QS Best Student City in 2017.

Universities 
Nanjing University is considered one of the top national universities nationwide, and it is ranked among the world's top 20 universities by Nature Index. According to the World Reputation Rankings by the Times Higher Educations, Nanjing University is ranked among the top 100 universities with its best reputation in 2021. Southeast University is also among the most famous universities in China and is considered one of the best universities for Architecture and Engineering in China. Many universities in Nanjing have satellite campuses or have moved their main campus to Xianlin University City in the eastern suburb. Some of the other most prominent national universities in Nanjing are:

Some of the other most prominent national universities in Nanjing are:

Nanjing University
Southeast University
Hohai University
Nanjing Normal University
Nanjing Xiaozhuang University
Nanjing University of Aeronautics and Astronautics
Nanjing University of Science and Technology
Nanjing Tech University
Nanjing Institute of Technology
Nanjing University of Information Science and Technology
Nanjing Audit University
Nanjing University of Finance and Economics
Nanjing University of Posts and Telecommunications
Nanjing Agricultural University
Nanjing Forestry University
China Pharmaceutical University
Nanjing Medical University
Nanjing University of Chinese Medicine
Nanjing Sport Institute
Nanjing Arts Institute
Jiangsu Second Normal University

Private universities and colleges, such as Communication University of China, Nanjing and Hopkins-Nanjing Center are also located in the city.

High schools 

Some notable high schools in Nanjing are: Jiangpu Senior High School, Jinling High School, Liuhe First School, Nanjing Foreign Language School, The Second Yuying Foreign Languages School of Nanjing, High School Affiliated to Nanjing Normal University, Nanjing No.1 High School, Nanjing Zhonghua High School, Caulfield Grammar School (Nanjing Campus), Nanjing No.29 High School, Yuhuatai Senior High School.

Twin towns – sister cities

Nanjing is twinned with:

 Akko, Israel
 Bandar Seri Begawan, Brunei
 Barranquilla, Colombia
 Biên Hòa, Vietnam
 Birmingham, United Kingdom
 Bloemfontein, South Africa
 Concepción, Chile
 Daejeon, South Korea
 Eindhoven, Netherlands
 Florence, Italy
 Katmandu, Nepal
 Leipzig, Germany
 Limassol, Cyprus
 London, Canada
 Malacca City, Malaysia
 Mexicali, Mexico
 Mogilev, Belarus
 Nagoya, Japan
 Perth, Australia
 Semarang, Indonesia
 Shiraz, Iran
 Siem Reap, Cambodia
 St. Louis, United States
 Windhoek, Namibia

The sister city relationship with Nagoya in Japan was suspended on February 21, 2012, following public comments by Nagoya mayor Takashi Kawamura denying the Nanking Massacre. The relationship has been subsequently restored.

Notable people

Xueqin Cao (1715 or 1724 - 1763 or 1764), Writer; Author of Dream of the Red Chamber
Anhua Gao (b. 1949), Chinese-British author
Hsiao Sa (b. 1953), Taiwanese author
Gang Tian (b. 1958), Mathematician; Professor at Princeton University
Zhang Xu, (b. 1961), Chinese neuroscientist
Wu Jianmin (b. 1962), Chinese democracy activist
Pan Deng (b. 1964), artist and painter
Deng Zhonghan (b. 1968), Chinese electrical engineer and entrepreneur
Pu Shu (b. 1973), Chinese singer-songwriter
Mei Ting (b. 1975), Chinese actress
Hai Qing (b. 1978), Chinese actress
Ni Ni (b. 1988), Chinese actress
Shiran Wang (b. 1989), Chinese pianist
Lei Wu (b. 1991), Footballer
Xu Anqi (b. 1992), Chinese fencer
Zhang Zetian (b. 1993), youngest Chinese female billionaire
Lu Keran (b. 1995), Chinese singer-dancer
Cenyu Han (b.2004), racing driver
Lu Kang, Chinese ambassador to Indonesia

Filmed in Nanjing 

 Film Jasmine Women《茉莉花开》
 Film Spring Fever《春风沉醉的夜晚》
 Film City of Life and Death《南京南京》
 Film The Flowers of War《金陵十三钗》
 Film The Founding of a Republic《建国大业》
 Film Blind Massage《推拿》
 Film Love is the Last Word《庐山恋2010》
 Film Dying to Survive《我不是药神》
 Film The Ark of Mr.Chow《少年班》
 Film Wolf Warriors《战狼1》
 Film So Young《致我们终将逝去的青春》
 Film Around the City《环城七十里》
 Film Soul Mate《七月与安生》
 Film Baby《宝贝儿》
 Film The Empire Symbol《帝国秘符》
 Television The Legend of White Snake《新白娘子传奇》
 Television《风中百合》
 Television Romance in the Rain《情深深雨蒙蒙》
 Television The Story of a Noble Family《金粉世家》
 Television Sound of Colors《地下铁》
 Television War and Destiny《乱世佳人》（TVB版）
 Television Memory Lost《美人为馅》
 Television Boyhood《我们的少年时代》
 Television Like a Flowing River《大江大河》

See also

Notes

References

Citations

Sources 

.

.

External links 

 Nanjing Government website
Nanjing English guide with open directory 
The Nanjinger: Nanjing's largest English news network with city guide
List of Nanjing Government Departments
Historic US Army map of Nanjing, 1945
"Nanking Illustrated" from 1624

|-

 
Cities in Jiangsu
Provincial capitals in China
Sub-provincial cities in the People's Republic of China
Yangtze River Delta
Port cities and towns in China
National Forest Cities in China
Jiangnan
Populated places established in the 1st millennium BC